Enzo Tonti (30 October 1935 – 10 June 2021) was an Italian physicist and mathematician, known for his contributions to engineering and mathematical physics.

Life 

Enzo Tonti was born in Milan. He attended an fine arts high school. He graduated in Mathematics and Physics at the University of Milan in 1961. He began work there in 1962 as research assistant in the field of mathematical physics. In the year 1976, he accepted a professorship at the Engineering Faculty of the University of Trieste. After retirement, he was nominated professor emeritus.
He married in 1962 and had three children (two daughters and one son).

Selected publications

Journal articles
Tonti E. A direct discrete formulation of field laws: The cell method. CMES- Computer Modeling in Engineering and Sciences. 2001 Jan 1;2(2):237-58.
Tonti, E., Finite formulation of the electromagnetic field. Progress in electromagnetics research,  2001. 32, pp. 1–44.
Tonti E. Finite formulation of electromagnetic field.IEEE Transactions on Magnetics. 2002 Aug 7;38(2):333-6. 
Tonti E. The reason for analogies between physical theories. Applied Mathematical Modelling. 1976 Jun 1;1(1):37-50  
Tonti E. Variational formulation for every nonlinear problem. International Journal of Engineering Science. 1984 Jan 1;22(11-12):1343-71.

Books
Tonti, Enzo. The Mathematical Structure of Classical and Relativistic Physics A General Classification Diagram. Springer. 2013.

References

External links

Italian physicists
Italian mathematicians
1935 births
2021 deaths